Hinterholz 8 is a 1998 Austrian comedy film directed by Harald Sicheritz. It is the most successful Austrian film in Austria since the 1960s with admissions of 617,597.

Cast 
 Roland Düringer - Herbert Krcal
 Nina Proll - Margit Krcal
 Rudolf Rohaczek - Philipp Krcal
 Wolfgang Böck - Meier
 Reinhard Nowak - Sepp Forstinger
 Lukas Resetarits - Willi
 Herwig Seeböck - Kandler
 I. Stangl - Gemeinderat
 Alfred Dorfer - Eberl
 Eva Billisich - Mrs. Meier
 Rudolf Buczolich - Margits Vater
 Erika Mottl - Margits Mutter
 Karl Ferdinand Kratzl - Mündel + Assistent von Kandler
 Andrea Händler - Kosmetikerin

References

External links 

1998 comedy films
1998 films
Austrian comedy films
1990s German-language films